Mama Qucha (Quechua:    "Mother Sea" or "Mother Lake", hispanicized spelling Mama Cocha) is the ancient Incan goddess of sea and fishes, guardian of sailors and fishermen, wife of Viracocha, mother of Inti and Mama Killa. In some regions of empire people believed she was the goddess of all bodies of water, including lakes, rivers, and even human-made watercourses. Mama Cocha was more important to people living beside the coastal regions due to nearness and dependence upon the sea. Inca beliefs in Mama Cocha and other water deities indicate that the people back then understood the basics of the hydrological cycle. They knew the seawater was replenishing the rain, which then fell over the ground.

References

Inca goddesses
Water goddesses